The 1993 Segunda División de Chile was the 42nd season of the Segunda División de Chile.

Rangers was the tournament's champion.

Aggregate table

See also
Chilean football league system

References

External links
 RSSSF 1993

Segunda División de Chile (1952–1995) seasons
Primera B
1993 in South American football leagues